The Men's Freestyle 65 kg competition of the wrestling events at the 2022 Mediterranean Games in Oran, Algeria, was held 27–28 June 2022 at the EMEC Hall.

Results
 Legend
 F — Won by fall

References

Men's Freestyle 65 kg